Jeep's SJ platform was part of the "FSJ" or full-size Jeep lineup.

This definition is known to include the following models:

 1963–1991 Jeep Wagoneer (renamed the “Grand Wagoneer” in 1984)
 1963–1988 Jeep Gladiator (renamed the “J” series in 1972)
 1967–1969 Jeep M-715/724/725/726/6217 military versions
 1974–1983 Jeep Cherokee

External links

SJ